Getaway  is the fourth studio album by the American hard rock band Adelitas Way released on February 26, 2016.

History
The album was crowd funded by fans on the band's pledge music campaign. The album was recorded at Groove master studios with producer Johnny K.

Track listing

Personnel
 Rick DeJesus - Vocals
 Trevor Stafford - Drums
 Robert Zakaryan - Guitar
 Andrew Cushing - Bass

References

2016 albums
Adelitas Way albums